Kópasker Airport  is an airport serving the coastal village of Kópasker, Iceland.

See also
Transport in Iceland
List of airports in Iceland

References

 Google Earth

External links
 OurAirports - Iceland
 Kópasker Airport
 OpenStreetMap - Kópasker

Airports in Iceland